Bob Pugh was a Welsh professional footballer who played for Newport County and Nottingham Forest

In 1929 Pugh was selected for the Football Association of Wales tour of Canada but these matches were not classed as international cap matches. His Newport County teammate Albert 'Nippy' Wardell was also selected for the tour. Pugh and Tommy Lewis of New Brighton were the only two players in the squad not to attain full international caps either before or after the tour.
He was transferred to Nottingham Forest in January 1931.

References

Welsh footballers
Newport County A.F.C. players
Nottingham Forest F.C. players
English Football League players
Year of death missing
Year of birth missing
Association football forwards